Melanie Kok [pronounced "Cook"] (born November 4, 1983, in Thunder Bay, Ontario) is a Canadian rower and neuroscientist. Kok won a bronze team medal in the Women's Lightweight Double Sculls at the 2008 Summer Olympics with Tracy Cameron.

Biography
Kok earned a B.A. at the University of Virginia in Charlottesville, Virginia, where she rowed as a varsity athlete for each of her four years as an undergraduate. Kok, a two-time team captain at UVa, earned All-American honours twice (2006, 2007). She was also named to the All-South Region and All-ACC teams. She went on to complete her master's degree in 2010 at McMaster University in Hamilton, Ontario in the MiNDS Graduate Neuroscience Program. Kok went on to complete her PhD in neuroscience at the Schulich School of Medicine and Dentistry at the University of Western Ontario in London, Ontario.

International career
Kok is a five-time member of the Canadian National Rowing team. She has won two World Rowing Championships medals: a gold in Gifu, JAP (2005) in the Lightweight Quadruple Sculls with Tracy Cameron, Mara Jones and Elizabeth Urbach, and a bronze in Munich, GER (2007) in the Lightweight Single Sculls.

She has also won two World Cup medals: a gold in Poznan, POL, and a bronze in Lucerne, SUI, both in 2008.

Kok competed at the Beijing 2008 Summer Olympics in the Women's Lightweight Doubles with Tracy Cameron and won a bronze team medal.

Kok was named the City of St. Catharines Athlete of the Year in 2005, and in 2008, as a co-winner with Olympic wrestler Tonya Verbeek.

At the 2011 Pan American Games, Kok won a silver team medal in the women's quadruple sculls.

References

External links
 Profile at Rowing Canada
 Profile at Virginiasports.com

1983 births
Rowers from Ontario
Canadian female rowers
Olympic rowers of Canada
Rowers at the 2008 Summer Olympics
Rowers at the 2011 Pan American Games
Olympic bronze medalists for Canada
Living people
McMaster University alumni
Virginia Cavaliers women's rowers
Olympic medalists in rowing
Sportspeople from Thunder Bay
Medalists at the 2008 Summer Olympics
World Rowing Championships medalists for Canada
Pan American Games silver medalists for Canada
Pan American Games medalists in rowing
Medalists at the 2011 Pan American Games
21st-century Canadian women